Carlos Alberto Rivera (born June 10, 1978) is a Puerto Rican former professional baseball first baseman. He played in Major League Baseball (MLB) for the Pittsburgh Pirates.

Career
He was drafted by the Pirates in the 10th round of the 1996 Major League Baseball draft.

In , Rivera hit .410 with 16 home runs and 73 RBI in 101 games for the Oaxaca Warriors in the Mexican League and was a midseason All-Star. After not playing during the  regular season, he played winter ball in his native Puerto Rico for the Ponce Lions and hit .321 with 31 RBI in 36 games. He also represented Puerto Rico in the 2009 Caribbean Series.

After starting the season with the Petroleros de Minatitlán of the Mexican League, Rivera signed with the Wichita Wingnuts of the American Association on July 30.

See also
 List of Major League Baseball players from Puerto Rico

External links

1978 births
Living people
Altoona Curve players
Augusta GreenJackets players
Broncos de Reynosa players
Colorado Springs Sky Sox players
Criollos de Caguas players
Guerreros de Oaxaca players
Gulf Coast Pirates players
Hickory Crawdads players
Leones de Ponce players
Liga de Béisbol Profesional Roberto Clemente infielders
Lynchburg Hillcats players
Major League Baseball first basemen
Major League Baseball players from Puerto Rico
Mexican League baseball first basemen
Nashville Sounds players
Olmecas de Tabasco players
People from Fajardo, Puerto Rico
Petroleros de Minatitlán players
Pittsburgh Pirates players
Puerto Rican expatriate baseball players in Mexico
Rockland Boulders players
Rojos del Águila de Veracruz players
Round Rock Express players
Saraperos de Saltillo players
Wichita Wingnuts players
Yaquis de Obregón players
2013 World Baseball Classic players